Love Never Dies may refer to:

Love Never Dies (1916 film), an American film directed by William Worthington
Love Never Dies (1921 film), an American silent drama directed by King Vidor
Love Never Dies (1955 film), an Argentine romantic drama directed and written by Luis César Amadori
"Love Never Dies" (song), a 1988 song by Belinda Carlisle
"Love Never Dies (Back for the First Time)", a 2010 song by Caspa and Mr Hudson
"Love Never Dies", a song from the 1996 album Kissing Rain by Roch Voisine
Love Never Dies (musical), the 2010 sequel to The Phantom of the Opera